Leucadendron is a genus of about 80 species of flowering plants in the family Proteaceae, endemic to South Africa, where they are a prominent part of the fynbos ecoregion and vegetation type.

Description
Species in the genus Leucadendron are small trees or shrubs that are erect or creeping. Most species are shrubs that grow up to 1 m tall, some to 2 or 3 m. A few grow into moderate-sized trees up to 16 m tall. All are evergreen. The leaves are largely elliptical, sometimes needle-like, spirally arranged, simple, entire, and usually green, often covered with a waxy bloom, and in the case of the Silvertree, with a distinct silvery tone produced by dense, straight, silky hairs. This inspired the generic name Leucadendron, which literally means "white tree".

The flowers are produced in dense inflorescences at the branch tips; plants are dioecious, with separate male and female plants.

The seed heads, or infructescences, of Leucadendron are woody cone-like structures. This gave rise to their generic common name cone-bush. The cones contain numerous seeds. The seed morphology is varied and reflects subgeneric groupings within the genus. A few such as the Silvertree, Leucadendron argenteum have a silky-haired parachute, enabling the large round nut to be dispersed by wind.  A few are rodent dispersed, cached by rats, and a few have elaiosomes and are dispersed by ants.  About half the species store the seeds in fire-proof cones and release them only after a fire has killed the plant or at least the branch bearing the cone.  Many such species hardly recruit naturally except after fires.

Cultivation 
Leucadendron plants are conventionally propagated through seedlings as well as cuttings. The seeds reach maturity over a duration of a year. This time of germination and emergence depends on the species. When using cuttings as propagating material, the season as well as the type of material used can affect the success rate of the cultivation. Cuttings are preferred as propagating material because it provides uniform offspring, whereas seedlings produce genetic variability in the offspring. The genus Leucadendron is more prone to genetic variation than a genus that tends to self-fertilize, because of its cross-pollinating nature. In the natural habitat, Leucadendron grows exceptionally well, but in the case of cultivation the specific needs of the plant  have to be readily available to allow optimal production to produce high quality cut flowers and foliage. Steps for cultivation include soil evaluation, clearing, drainage, chemical correction, and the physical preparation should be critically considered five months prior to planting Leucadendrons.
The selection criteria for cultivating Leucadendron species is of great importance and should be based on the agricultural ability of the plant as well as the current market standards.

Selected species

Leucadendron album
Leucadendron arcuatum
Leucadendron argenteum
Leucadendron barkerae
Leucadendron bonum
Leucadendron brunioides
Leucadendron burchellii
Leucadendron cadens
Leucadendron chamelaea
Leucadendron cinereum
Leucadendron comosum
Leucadendron concavum
Leucadendron conicum
Leucadendron coniferum
Leucadendron cordatum
Leucadendron coriaceum
Leucadendron corymbosum
Leucadendron cryptocephalum
Leucadendron daphnoides
Leucadendron diemontianum
Leucadendron discolor
Leucadendron dregei
Leucadendron dubium
Leucadendron elimense
Leucadendron ericifolium
Leucadendron eucalyptifolium
Leucadendron flexuosum
Leucadendron floridum
Leucadendron foedum
Leucadendron galpinii
Leucadendron gandogeri
Leucadendron glaberrimum
Leucadendron globosum
Leucadendron grandiflorum
Leucadendron gydoense
Leucadendron immoderatum
Leucadendron lanigerum
Leucadendron laureolum
Leucadendron laxum
Leucadendron levisanus
Leucadendron linifolium
Leucadendron loeriense
Leucadendron loranthifolium
Leucadendron macowanii
Leucadendron meridianum
Leucadendron meyerianum
Leucadendron microcephalum
Leucadendron modestum
Leucadendron muirii
Leucadendron nervosum
Leucadendron nitidum
Leucadendron nobile
Leucadendron olens
Leucadendron orientale
Leucadendron osbornei
Leucadendron platyspermum
Leucadendron pondoense
Leucadendron procerum
Leucadendron pubescens
Leucadendron pubibracteolatum
Leucadendron radiatum
Leucadendron remotum
Leucadendron roodii
Leucadendron rourkei
Leucadendron rubrum
Leucadendron salicifolium
Leucadendron salignum
Leucadendron sericeum
Leucadendron sessile
Leucadendron sheilae
Leucadendron singulare
Leucadendron sorocephalodes
Leucadendron spirale
Leucadendron spissifolium
Leucadendron stellare
Leucadendron stelligerum
Leucadendron strobilinum
Leucadendron teretifolium
Leucadendron thymifolium
Leucadendron tinctum
Leucadendron tradouwense
Leucadendron uliginosum
Leucadendron verticillatum
Leucadendron xanthoconus

Hybridization
The drive behind the production of new Leucadendron cultivars is the production of a constant supply of new and improved quality products that are available initially from South Africa only. The genus Leucadendron is popular amongst consumers due to its colourful bracts and long vase life. Leucadendron hybrids are produced through interspecific hybridization. Crosses made within the same subsection are generally more viable in the hybridization of Leucadendrons with the quantity of seed set relative to the taxonomic relatedness of the species. Intersectional hybridization produces hybrids that show a unique set of characteristics which are favoured by consumers. One example of a hybrid produced by two Leucadendron genera is the cultivar ‘Rosette’, a hybrid between L. laureolum and L. elimense. This interspecific hybrid is however completely sterile due to autopolyploidy and thus have no use in further cultivation. The main aim of interspecific hybridization is to produce large quantities of progeny seed from the best interspecific hybrid parents.

In the UK the cultivars ‘Safari Sunset’ and ‘Inca Gold’ have gained the Royal Horticultural Society’s Award of Garden Merit.

References

External links

 
Proteaceae genera
Endemic flora of South Africa
Flora of the Cape Provinces
Fynbos
Dioecious plants